The St Andrews Viking is a family of American powered parachutes that was designed and manufactured by St Andrews Aviation of Panama City, Florida and later produced by Viking Aircraft Inc., also of Panama City.

Design and development
The two-seat Viking II was designed to comply with the US FAR 103 Ultralight Vehicles two-seat trainer rules. It features a parachute-style high-wing, two-seats-in-side-by-side configuration, tricycle landing gear and a single  Rotax 503 engine in pusher configuration. The  2si 690-L70 engine was a factory option.

The aircraft is built from tubing and includes a partial cockpit fairing. The side-by-side seating configuration is unusual in powered parachutes, but was intended to make dual instruction easier. In flight steering is accomplished via dual foot pedals that actuate the canopy brakes, creating roll and yaw. On the ground the aircraft has a center-mounted bicycle handlebar that controls the nosewheel steering. The main landing gear incorporates steel spring rod suspension. The aircraft was factory supplied in the form of an assembly kit or could be delivered ready-to-fly.

Variants
Viking I
Single seat version introduced in March 2000, that sold for US$10,900 complete and ready-to-fly in 2001.
Viking II
Two-seats-in-side-by-side configuration version introduced in 1998, that sold for US$12,000 complete and ready-to-fly, US$10,000 complete but unassembled or US$4,300 for the carriage kit only, less engine and canopy, in 2001.

Specifications (Viking II)

References

External links
Viking archives on Archive.org

1990s United States ultralight aircraft
Single-engined pusher aircraft
Powered parachutes